Garnett may refer to:

 Garnett (surname)
 Garnett, Kansas, a city in Kansas
 Garnett station, a MARTA rail station in Atlanta, Georgia

See also
Harnett